The 2006 West Coast Conference men's basketball tournament took place March 3–6, 2006. All rounds were held in Spokane, Washington at the McCarthey Athletic Center. The semifinals were televised by ESPN2. The West Coast Conference Championship Game was televised by ESPN.

The Gonzaga Bulldogs earned their third straight (eighth overall) WCC Tournament title and an automatic bid to the 2006 NCAA tournament. Adam Morrison of Gonzaga was named Tournament MVP for the second straight year.

Bracket
* – Denotes overtime period

See also 
West Coast Conference

References

External links
2006 Tournament Bracket

Tournament
West Coast Conference men's basketball tournament
West Coast Athletic Conference men's basketball tournament
West Coast Athletic Conference men's basketball tournament
Basketball competitions in Washington (state)
Sports competitions in Spokane, Washington
College sports tournaments in Washington (state)